Kalogria may refer to the following places:

Kalogria, the Greek name for Kallurga, in Northern Cyprus
in Greece:
Kalogria, Achaea
Kalogria beach, a beach in Achaea, northwest Peloponnese
Kalogria, Chalkidiki, a village in Chalkidiki
Kalogria beach, Messenia, a beach in the municipality West Mani, Messenia
Kalogria Bay, in the Gulf of Euboea

See also
Kalogriana, a village in Karditsa regional unit
Kalogriani, a village in Trikala regional unit